The sedentary Arlije are the main group of the Romani people in North Macedonia, and the majority live in Šuto Orizari Municipality. They belong to the Muslim Romani people. There are various subgroups of the Arlije, named after their traditional occupations, living in North Macedonia, Kosovo, and southern Southern Serbia (geographical region), and Montenegro. Beside Macedonian and Albanian, they speak the Arli dialect of Balkan Romani. The word Arlije (singular Arli) is derived from the Turkish word yerli (meaning "native" or "settled"), as does the name Erlides (of a similar group living in Greece, and the Sofia-Erli in Bulgaria. The biggest settlement of Arlije is in Šuto Orizari in North Macedonia. In East Thrace at Turkey, they are called Yerli Romanlar and only speak Rumelian Turkish.

Many Arlije have moved to Austria and Germany as guest workers. Some Arli men have married Austrian and German women.

Genetics
While the Early Romani people traces back to the Indian subcontinent, gene flow from the Ottoman Turks also spilled over and established a higher frequency of the Y-haplogroups J and E3b in Balkan Roma Groups. The Greek doctor A. G. Paspati made also the statement in his Book, that Turks married often Roma woman. Greek-Slavic DNA also in the Balkan Roma people.

People of Arlije descent 
Šaban Bajramović
Esma Redžepova
Muharem Serbezovski

References 

 
Romani in Kosovo
Romani in North Macedonia
Romani religion
Muslims by nationality
Muslim communities in Europe